Carling is a township in Ontario, Canada, located in the District of Parry Sound on Georgian Bay. Killbear Provincial Park is located in the municipality.

The CBC Television series The Rez was shot in the township at Harrison Landing.

Communities
Adanac
Brooks Landing
Carling
Dillon is located on central Georgian Bay near Franklin Island. The area is popular for campers and outfitters because of the sheltered bays and coves. Community landmarks include the Dillon Cove Marina, Dillon Bridge, Shawanaga River and its rapids.  As a cottage destination, the population is low during the winter months, and increases in the summer with cottagers and tourists.
Killbear Park
Shebeshekong
Snug Harbour
Snug Haven
Woods

Demographics 

Mother tongue (2006):
 English as first language: 92.9%
 French as first language: 0.9%
 English and French as first language: 0%
 Other as first language: 6.2%

See also
List of townships in Ontario

References

External links 

Municipalities in Parry Sound District
Single-tier municipalities in Ontario
Township municipalities in Ontario